Swiss Cottage is a district of London.

Swiss Cottage may also refer to:

 Swiss Cottage (ward), an electoral ward in London
 Swiss Cottage, Cahir, a building in Cahir, Tipperary
 Swiss Cottage, Rievaulx, a Grade II listed building in North Yorkshire
 Swiss Cottage, Rockfield, Monmouthshire, Wales
 Swiss Cottage tube station, a London Underground station at Swiss Cottage, north London
 Swiss Cottage tube station (1868–1940), a disused London Underground station